St. Mary's Church is a church in Mbreshtan, a village near Berat, Albania. It became a Cultural Monument of Albania in 1948.

References

Cultural Monuments of Albania
Churches in Berat